The 2018 Charleston Battery season is the club's 26th year of existence, their 15th season in the second tier of the United States Soccer Pyramid. It is their eighth season in the United Soccer League as part of the Eastern Conference.

Background 

The Battery finished the 2017 season with a record of 15–9–8, finished 2nd in the Eastern Conference, and 3rd overall. In the 2017 USL Playoffs, Charleston were upset in the first round by the New York Red Bulls II. Elsewhere, the Battery reached the fourth round of the 2017 U.S. Open Cup, losing 2–3 to MLS outfit, Atlanta United.

Club

Transfers

In

Out

Loaned in

Non-competitive

Carolina Challenge Cup

Competitive

USL

Table

Results by round

Regular season 

All times are in Eastern Time Zone.

Postseason

U.S. Open Cup

References

External links 
Battery Official Website

Charleston Battery seasons
Charleston Battery
Charleston Battery
2018 in sports in South Carolina